Most Dangerous Man Alive is a 1961 American science fiction film, produced by Benedict Bogeaus, directed by Allan Dwan (the final film of his long career), that stars Ron Randell, Debra Paget, and Elaine Stewart. The film was distributed by Columbia Pictures.

Plot

Gangster Eddie Candel is framed for a crime he didn't commit. Escaping from the police he flees to the desert.  stumbling by accident into an atomic bomb testing site.

Eddie is exposed to high levels of radiation, and his body begins to transform in remarkable ways. With his new mental and a near steel physical body, he sets out to take revenge against all those who betrayed him. His first target is rival gangster Andy Damon, who took over his gang and framed him for the murder. Andy fights back, but Candel's new near invulnerability makes his efforts useless.  Damo does manage to kill Candel's gang girlfriend.

Candel's ex-girlfriend and a sympathetic scientist attempt to help him and dissuade him from this course of action but are unsuccessful. The scientist wants to study how Candel survived despite being exposed to so much radiation

The National Guard (United States) is called in and uses flame throwers to end Candel's life, turning him to dust.

Cast
 Ron Randell as Eddie Candell
 Debra Paget as Linda Marsh
 Elaine Stewart as Carla Angelo
 Anthony Caruso as Andy Damon
 Gregg Palmer as Lt. Fisher
 Morris Ankrum as Capt. Davis

Production

The genesis of the film is a bit vague. One source says the film began as a story by Leo Gordon called The Atomic Man. Gordon went to fellow actor Michael Pate to rewrite the story. Needing money, Gordon sold his rights to Pate who took the story to his brother-in-law, screenwriter Phillip Rock.

The screenplay was written by James Leicester and Phillip Rock and is based on The Steel Monster by Phillip Rock, Michael Pate, and Leo Gordon. Michael Pate also co-wrote the script.

Producer Benedict Bogeaus had wanted to shoot the film as a television pilot (a common creative practice of the time), to be shown on TV as three episodes, should it be picked up for syndication. Traveling to Mexico to begin shooting in 1960, Mexican film syndicates ruled that it was actually a feature film and demanded Bogeaus make it using a full crew, which would now have to be paid at feature film labor rates. With the budget now tripled, director Allen Dwan claimed he had to shoot the feature in one week, instead of five (some members of the cast disputed this statement).

It was Randell's last leading role.

Reviews

The New York Times in a contemporary review warned the readers away from this movie, finding it be so bad the audience was laughing in the wrong places.

Fantastic Musings was kindlier to the movie, citing its ability to make the main character sympathetic. It did note similarities to the Lon Chaney Jr. movie The Indestructible Man

Film Fanatic found little to praise here other than effective cinematography.

Home media
Most Dangerous Man Alive was released by Cinema Rarities as a manufactured on demand two-disc DVD-R set. It contains both the widescreen and pan-and-scan TV release versions. The widescreen is transferred from a surviving TV syndication print and contains occasional local station identifiers, etc.

Notes

Bibliography
 Warren, Bill. Keep Watching the Skies!: American Science Fiction Movies of the Fifties, The 21st Century Edition. Jefferson, North Carolina: McFarland & Company, 2009. . Covers science fiction films made from 1950 through 1962. 1040 pages.

External links
Most Dangerous Man Alive at IMDb
Review of film at DVD Talk
Review of film at New York Times

1961 films
Films directed by Allan Dwan
Films shot in Mexico
Columbia Pictures films
1960s science fiction films
American independent films
American science fiction films
Films about technological impact
1960s English-language films
American black-and-white films
Films about nuclear war and weapons
American crime films
1961 independent films
1960s American films
Science fiction crime films